Param was a Japanese video game development company that worked in partnership with Nintendo. Param was a part of Marigul Management. Param was defunct as Marigul was liquidated in May 2003.

Company Profile
Kazutoshi Iida, a graduate of Tama Art University born in 1968, founded Param in 1997. Before Param, Iida lead development of Tail of the Sun and Aquanaut's Holiday. The team was responsible for the Nintendo 64DD game Kyojin no Doshin (known as Doshin the Giant outside Japan), which was released in Japan only, but was ported to the GameCube and released in Japan and Europe. An expansion titled Kyojin no Doshin Kaihō Sensen Chibikko Chikko Daishūgō for the Nintendo 64DD was released five months after the initial game. The company was headed up by Takao Kurebayashi, Kazutoshi Iida and Yana. Kazutoshi Iida moved on to a company called Umigame Bunko, translated as Sea Turtle Library, and worked with Marvelous Entertainment on Discipline for WiiWare. Iida became a professor of Film at Ritsumeikan University.

Games

Nintendo 64DD
Doshin the Giant
Kyojin no Doshin Kaihō Sensen Chibikko Chikko Daishūgō

External links
Archive of the Official Marigul Website (Japanese)
Source of Company Profile (IGN)
N-Sider's article containing info about Marigul Management, Inc.

References

Nintendo divisions and subsidiaries
Defunct video game companies of Japan
Video game companies established in 1997
Video game companies disestablished in 2003
Video game development companies
Japanese companies established in 1997
Japanese companies disestablished in 2003